South of Fifth, also known as SoFi, is a small exclusive affluent neighborhood in South Beach (Miami Beach) that goes from South Pointe Park north to fifth street; from east to west. The area is surrounded by water on three sides from the Ocean to Biscayne Bay. South of Fifth is considered a peaceful oasis with immediate access to many of South Beach's notable activities.

At one time, South of Fifth was a deplorable area that criminals and cast offs called home. It took visionaries and risk takers to believe in the potential of this plot of land. Because of their brave actions in investing in this space, South of Fifth has become a highly desired place to live.

South Pointe Park is a 17-acre park and promenade in this area that features a kids area, plenty of lush lawn for picnics, hills and walkways for outdoor exercising, and direct access to the beach. This family and pet friendly park is located in the same area as one of South Beach’s most historic restaurant: Joe's Stone Crab. Other famous restaurants include: Smith & Wollensky, Prime 112, Prime Italian, and Milos among others.

South of Fifth is home to some of Miami Beach's most luxurious condos like: Glass house, Portofino Tower, Apogee South Beach, Icon, Murano Grande, Murano at Portofino, Continuum Towers, Ocean House, South Pointe Tower and the Yacht Club At Portofino.

References

Geography of Miami
Neighborhoods in Miami Beach, Florida